Mount Parnassus is a high mountain summit in the Front Range of the Rocky Mountains of North America.

Location and geography
Mount Parnassus sits east of the Continental Divide in the Front Range of the Rocky Mountains. The summit is located near Interstate 70. It is also in close proximity to Woods Mountain, Mount Sniktau, Engelmann Peak, Robeson Peak, and Pettingell Peak.

Hiking
By automobile, Mount Parnassus is about one hour west of Denver. Hikers may reach the summit of the mountain on foot by following the Watrous Gulch Trail, starting at the Herman Gulch Trailhead off of Interstate 70.

Historical names
Mount Parnassus – 1933 
Scout Peak

See also

List of Colorado mountain ranges
List of Colorado mountain summits
List of Colorado fourteeners
List of Colorado 4000 meter prominent summits
List of the most prominent summits of Colorado
List of Colorado county high points

References

External links

Mount Parnassus on 13ers.com
Mount Parnassus on SummitPost

Parnassus
Parnassus
Arapaho National Forest
Parnassus